"Just Between You and Me" is a single by Canadian hard rock band April Wine, from their ninth studio album The Nature of the Beast, released in 1981 (See 1981 in music).

Background
The music video for this song was the fourteenth video played on MTV's first day of broadcast, making it the first video by a Canadian recording artist ever played on MTV. 
The final chorus of the album version includes the song's title in French: "Seulement entre toi et moi".

Chart performance
"Just Between You and Me" was a top 25 hit in the US, and peaked at No.13 on the CHUM Chart in Toronto, Canada.  It was also a minor hit in the UK, where it went to No.52.

References

April Wine songs
1981 songs
1981 singles
Songs written by Myles Goodwyn
Rock ballads
Song recordings produced by Mike Stone (record producer)
Aquarius Records (Canada) singles
Capitol Records singles